Yasu Station is the name of two train stations in Japan:

Yasu Station (Kōchi), Konan, Kochi prefecture
Yasu Station (Shiga), Yasu, Shiga prefecture